Julien Romain (born 23 February 1996) is a French professional footballer who plays as a midfielder for Furiani-Agliani.

Career
Romain is a youth exponent from SC Bastia. He made his Ligue 1 debut in a 1–2 home defeat against Evian at 3 December 2014.

Romain scored his debut goal in his first appearance of the 2015–2016 season in a 1–2 home defeat to Monaco.

Having spent the first half of the 2016–17 season on loan at Ligue 2 team Gazélec Ajaccio, he was loaned out to Championnat National side Pau FC for the second half of the season.

Romain remained at Bastia for the 2017–18 season, despite administrative relegation to Championnat National 3. A serious ankle injury in January 2018 ruled him out for the rest of the season. He moved to Bergerac in Championnat National 2 for the 2018–19 season, but didn't play any games and was released at the end of the season. In January 2019 he started training with Furiani-Agliani to aide his recuperation. He eventually signed for the club in June 2020.

Career statistics

References

External links
 

1996 births
Living people
French footballers
Association football midfielders
Ligue 1 players
Ligue 2 players
SC Bastia players
Gazélec Ajaccio players
Bergerac Périgord FC players
AS Furiani-Agliani players
Corsica international footballers
Footballers from Corsica